Haukas may refer to:

 Haukås, a family name
Michael Haukås, Norwegian footballer
Torfinn Haukås
 members of the Hauka movement, a religious movement which arose in French Colonial Africa.